The Miami News was an evening newspaper in Miami, Florida. It was the media market competitor to the morning edition of the Miami Herald for most of the 20th century. The paper started publishing in May 1896 as a weekly called The Miami Metropolis.
The Metropolis had become a daily (except Sunday) paper of eight pages by 1903. On June 4, 1923, former Ohio governor James M. Cox bought the Metropolis and renamed it the Miami Daily News-Metropolis. On January 4, 1925 the newspaper became the Miami Daily News, and published its first Sunday edition.

Cox had a new building erected for the newspaper, and the Miami News Tower was dedicated on July 25, 1925. This building later became famous as the Freedom Tower. Also on July 25, 1925, the News published a 508 page edition, which still holds the record for the largest page-count for a newspaper.

The News was edited by Bill Baggs from 1957 until his death in 1969. After that, it was edited by Sylvan Meyer until 1973. Its final editor was Howard Kleinberg, a longtime staffer and author of a comprehensive history of the newspaper. The paper had the distinction of posting its own demise on the final obituary page.

In 1966, the News moved in with the Knight Ridder-owned Herald at One Herald Plaza, sharing production facilities with its morning rival while maintaining a separate editorial staff. A 30-year joint operating agreement inked in 1966 made the Herald responsible for all non-editorial aspects of production, including circulation, advertising and promotion. Citing losses of $9 million per year, declining circulation (from 112,000 in 1966 to 48,000 in 1988 while households in the Dade County area grew 80 percent) and owner Cox Newspapers unable to find a suitable buyer to save the paper, the News ceased publication on December 31, 1988. Some of the newspaper's staff and all of its assets and archives were moved to nearby Cox publication The Palm Beach Post (now owned by Gannett) in West Palm Beach.

A small selection of photographs were donated to the Archives and Research Center of HistoryMiami.

History
The Miami Metropolis was published from 1896 to 1908. Walter S. Graham served as editor.

Notable employees
Notable former employees include writer Marjory Stoneman Douglas, Dorothy Misener Jurney, journalist and author Helen Muir, Pulitzer Prize-winning cartoonist Don Wright, Boston Globe columnist Adrian Walker, photographer Michael O'Brien, columnist John Keasler and best-selling author Dary Matera, who served as a general assignment reporter from 1977 until 1982.

Pulitzer Prizes 

 1939 – public service, for its campaign for the recall of the Miami City Commission
 1959 – national reporting, Howard Van Smith, for a series of articles that focused public notice on deplorable conditions in a Florida migrant labor camp, resulted in the provision of generous assistance for the 4,000 stranded workers in the camp, and thereby called attention to the national problem presented by 1,500,000 migratory laborers.
 1963 – international reporting, Hal Hendrix, for his persistent reporting which revealed, at an early stage, that the Soviet Union was installing missile launching pads in Cuba and sending in large numbers of MIG-21 aircraft.
 1966 – editorial cartooning, Don Wright, for "You Mean You Were Bluffing?"
 1980 – editorial cartooning, Don Wright

References

External links

Miami Metropolis, freely available with full text and full page images in the Florida Digital Newspaper Library
Daily Miami Metropolis, from 1904-7 freely available with full text and full page images in the Florida Digital Newspaper Library
Miami Daily News, from 1929 freely available with full text and full page images in the Florida Digital Newspaper Library
History of The Miami News, 1896-1987, by Howard Kleinberg. Centennial history of The Miami News, written by its last editor.
Sylvan Meyer and The Miami News

1896 establishments in Florida
1988 disestablishments in Florida
Cox Newspapers
Defunct newspapers published in Florida
Mass media in Miami
Publications established in 1896
Publications disestablished in 1988
Pulitzer Prize-winning newspapers
Pulitzer Prize for Public Service winners